Events from the year 1747 in France

Incumbents
 Monarch – Louis XV

Events
2 July – Battle of Lauffeld
19 July – Battle of Assietta

Births

Full date missing
Armand Louis de Gontaut military officer and politician (died 1793)
Rose Bertin, hatmaker and dressmaker (died 1813)
Joséphine Leroux, Ursuline nun (died 1794)

Deaths

Full date missing
Philibert Orry, statesman (born 1689)
Jean-Baptiste Barrière, cellist and composer (born 1707)
Antoine Monnoyer, painter (born 1670)
Nicholas Mahudel, antiquarian (born 1673)

See also

References

1740s in France